Mishael ("who is like God") or Misael may refer to:

Biblical figures
Mishael (son of Uzziel), cousin of Moses, Aaron, and Miriam
Original Hebrew name of Meshach

People

Misael
Misael (footballer, born 1987), full name Misael Silva Jansen, Brazilian football forward
Misael (footballer, born 1994), full name Misael Bueno, Brazilian football midfielder
Misael (footballer, born 2002), full name Misael Messias Nunes Xavier, Brazilian football midfielder

Mishael
 Mishael Abbott (born 1981), American racing driver
  (1920–1997), Sephardic Chief Rabbi of Beersheva
 Mishael Cheshin (1936–2015), Israeli Supreme Court justice
 Mishael Morgan (born 1986), Trinidadian-Canadian actress

Hebrew-language given names